L'Illustration Européenne (1870–1914) was a Belgian illustrated weekly newspaper providing general news, serialised fiction, historical anecdotes, short biographies of famous figures, and travel writing. The illustrations (portraits, views, and so forth) that accompanied the stories were the paper's main selling point. The first manager and editor was Théo Spée.

In 1885, L'Illustration Européenne became the first Belgian periodical to print a halftone photograph.

The owners of the Parisian illustrated weekly L'Illustration attempted to sue the owners of L'Illustration Européenne for unfair competition in having given their publication a misleadingly similar name. They were unsuccessful in the Belgian courts, but in 1888 did get the French courts to ban the sale of the Belgian weekly in France.

References

External links
 First 52 issues (November 1870 to November 1871) on Google Books.

1870 establishments in Belgium
1914 disestablishments in Belgium
News magazines published in Belgium
Weekly magazines published in Belgium
Defunct magazines published in Belgium
Magazines established in 1870
Magazines disestablished in 1914
Magazines published in Brussels
Weekly news magazines